Senen is a long-established urban district of Jakarta, Indonesia that has kept many tourist attractions such as two museums, the National Library of Indonesia and Gelanggang Remaja Senen, a quite narrow alley with old Chinese and similar style shops and restaurants. It was first developed in the 18th-century as Pasar Senen when governor Daendels established the bovenstad ("the upper town") as the new center of government of the fledgling city (then known as Batavia). Its kernel remains in what is now the formal lower-tier Village/Neighbourhood of Senen, within, the others being Kwitang, Kenari, Paseban, Kramat, and Bungur. This article covers the archetypal core and the whole Subdistrict of Central Jakarta.

Toponym
The name abbreviates Pasar Senen, "Monday Market".

Limits
The limits are a railway line to the east, Ciliwung River to the west, Jalan Pramuka Street to the south, and Jalan Abdul Rahman Saleh-Kwini II-Senen Raya IV (Jalan meaning road/street) to the north.

Transport
The district is served with Pasar Senen railway station and Senen bus/coach terminal/station for Transjakarta and Kopaja bus services. Important roads include Kramat Raya road (the main road that formerly linked Jakarta with Jatinegara) and Senen Raya street (the focal point of the Senen market).

Local government
The subdistrict of Senen is divided into six administrative villages (kelurahan):

History

Early establishment of Pasar Senen
Following the establishment of the upper town (bovenstad) of Batavia, Justinus Vinck, a Dutch entrepreneur, decided to develop two markets to serve the upper town. On 30 August 1733, Vinck established two markets: Pasar Tanah Abang (erroneously spelled as Tanabang) to the southwest of Koningsplein and Pasar Senen (variously spelled as Pasar Senin, Bazaar Senin, Passar Senen, Passer Senen) to the east of Koningsplein and its broader Weltevreden suburb (meaning well-contented), a European-centric neighborhood of the upper town. Both markets were connected with a road simply known as weg van Tanabang naar Weltevreden, which would later become Jalan Kwitang & KH. Wahid Hasyim. The market site stood straddling today's Segitiga Senen ("Senen Triangle") and Pasar Senen (the government-owned market between the train station and Senen street).

In the beginning of the 19th-century, Pasar Senen became the focal point of Weltevreden, hosting the military heart of Weltevreden, the Kampementen along the road from the old town to Meester Cornelis (Matramanweg, then Kramat Raya / Salemba Raya streets). Settlements also prospered along this road, such as Kampung Kwitang, Kampung Kramat and Kampung Salemba or Slemba. Several forts and military complex were established to keep the security of the road.

Pasar Senen also became the gateway of the city for people coming from the kampung, to the east.

Modern colonialism
As time went on, Pasar Senen grew into a mainly Chinese commercial center. Its heart became partly filled with Chinese-style shop houses and narrow alleyways (Dutch gang[en]). Among these were Gang Wang Seng, Gang Kenanga Noord, Gang Kenanga Zuid in what is now Segitiga Senen; and Gang Senen Binnen in what is now Pasar Senen.

The road to or from Meester Cornelis thrived as well. It was much-lined with the formidable façades of a three key employment sites with commanding Ciliwung river views behind: the STOVIA, an opium factory, and a military complex.

In the late 19th-century, Pasar Senen was traversed by a railway and street tramlines. In 1886, a railway station was established to the east of Pasar Senen, serving as logistic station for the area. A newer station was built a few yards to the east of the older station in 1925. Pasar Senen became Jakarta's busiest commercial and entertainment center.

The beginning of 20th century saw several theatres/cinemas set up locally such as the Rex and Grand Theater Cinemas.

Post-independence period

Following the independence of Indonesia, people from around Indonesia began to flock to the new capital of the country in search for possibilities not available in their regional homelands. Pasar Senen area, originally a Chinese-dominated area, became populated by Bantenese, West Javanese, Padang (Minangkabau) and Batak traders and employees during the 1950s.

By the late 1950s, Pasar Senen had deteriorated into a slum and home to criminal gangs, illegal gambling, prostitutes, and pickpockets. This reputation continues to this day despite the multiple revitalization of the area. During the period, part, especially next to Pasar Senen railway station became Jakarta's main red light district. Economically and socially marginalized people were drawn to Senen, such as the homeless, market sellers, prostitutes, criminals, gamblers, and lower-income artists and contract laborers. The red light district received the nickname "Planet Senen", a playful 1960s term alluding to the Space Race between the Soviet Union and the United States, to refer its relative isolation from the rest of Jakarta. This was quoted as "a black place (daerah hitam), a place without a master/rules, with dead bodies on the side of the road. Quasi-prostitution was common in downtown Senen, doger dancers (penari doger). The dances are performed by women wearing a very tight and very thin kebaya dress and a batik cloth. They wore locally-made lipstick and powder as imported cosmetics were too dear. These dancers were mostly immigrants from eastern provinces such as Klender and Bekasi. Such dancers began to earn from the early evenings onwards. Men may touch and kiss them for a price. Such paid performance and companionship even took place in carriages when close to the Pasar Senen railway station.

Planet Senen also became a popular meeting place for young artists, poets, and writers in the 1950s and '60s. Every such Seniman Senen (senen artist), would congregate in local venues to discuss philosophies and aesthetics of Jakarta. Among these were Sukarno M. Noor, Rendra Karno, Dahlia, Nurnaningsih, A.N. Alcaff, Benyamin Sueb, Bing Slamet, and Misbach Yusa Biran. The melting pot of artists in Planet Senen would gave birth to Jakarta's recording stars of the 1970s and 1980s.

Dangdut, a genre of Indonesian urban music, developed in marginalized urban neighborhoods in the late 1960s and early 1970s such as Bangunrejo in Surabaya, Sunan Kuning in Semarang, and Planet Senen in Jakarta. Dangdut musicians who started their career in Planet Senen were Asmin Cayder, Rhoma Irama, Mukhsin Alatas, Husein Bawafie, and Mashabi.

Project Senen (1960s)

In 1962, the Jakarta city government and several private investors formed PT. Pembangunan Jaya as a joint public-private partnership to revitalize Senen and replaced the old shops. The strategy, known as the Proyek Senen ("Project Senen") replaced the old Chinese shops with a complex of modern shopping center, consisting of six modern market blocks numbered I to VI. This plan displaced many urban dwellers from the original Planet Senen. Construction of Block I started in 1962 and was completed in 1966. The last Block, VI, was completed in 1977; a new bus terminal was built next to this in 1980.

In 1973, as part of the revitalization strategy of Pasar Senen, the Planet Senen prostitution and gambling complex were shut down. Senen prostitutes were displaced to Kramat Tunggak, North Jakarta, by governor Ali Sadikin, which would also become the largest red light district in later years. In 1968, Taman Ismail Marzuki arts center on nearby Cikini were established as a new congregation point for Senen artists and poets.

On 15 January 1974, students from the Planet Senen youth center demonstrated against the government's policy regarding the role of foreign investment in Indonesia. Beginning in front of Senen market, the demonstration led to a series of riots known as the Malari incident. The riots attacked a visible Japanese presence in Indonesia such as an Astra dealership selling Toyota-brand cars on Sudirman Street. Later the riots shifted to an anti-Chinese Indonesian pogrom, attacking stores owned by ethnic Chinese, including the Senen shopping complex.

Present time
In 1990, the government built a modern shopping center, the Atrium which before 1997 Asian financial crisis hosted the international brand of Yaohan and Marks & Spencer as its anchor tenant.

With the trend of transit-oriented development in Jakarta ushered by construction of infrastructure projects such as the Jakarta Mass Rapid Transit, Senen will be subjected to a new urban design scheme which integrates the existing infrastructure Pasar Senen railway station, the TransJakarta bus rapid transit, and the future Jakarta Mass Rapid Transit station for the east–west line.

Landmarks of Senen Subdistrict

The following historic landmarks and important places are located within Senen Subdistrict:
Within the historic Senen
Gelanggang Remaja Senen
Grand Theater cinema
Pasar Senen Station
Senen Shopping Centre (consists of Pasar Senen ("Senen market") and Plaza Atrium Senen)

Within the Subdistrict of Senen
Cipto Mangunkusumo Central Hospital 
Faculty of Medicine of the University of Indonesia
Museum of Indonesian National Awakening (formerly the STOVIA medical school)
National Library of Indonesia
St. Carolus Hospital, Paseban administrative village
Sumpah Pemuda Museum
Vincentius orphanage (built about 1855)
The Wayang Orang Bharata theatre which stages Wayang orang shows on most Saturday nights

Grand Senen Theater

The Grand Theater was a cinema hall located at Senen in Jakarta, Indonesia. The historic cinema dates back to the 1930s when it was called Rex Cinema and was centrally located in Batavia's trade and entertainment district Senen. Despite its history, the cinema was in an extremely poor condition and survived by offering low budget movies (usually horror or erotic), finally closed operation in 2016.

Grand Theater dates back to the 1930 when it was called the Kramat Theatre. The cinema was prominent as it was centrally located in Weltevreden's entertainment district, Senen. In 1935, Kramat Theatre was renamed Rex Theatre. In November 1946, the cinema received the name November 1946 after a total renovation. The cinema's golden age was during the 1930s up until the 1950s, an era in Jakarta before television was available.

When television is available in Indonesia, many cinemas are closed in Jakarta, including Jakarta's oldest cinema, the Globe, which was opened in 1910 but has to be closed in 2009. Grand Theater on the other hand survived by offering low budget movies e.g. horror and erotic movies. With the closing of the Globe, Grand Theater was the oldest cinema hall in Jakarta that was operating until 2016. Attempts by director Joko Anwar to revive the cinema for a screening of Impetigore in 2019 were cancelled due to permit issues.

Patung Perjuangan Senen
Patung Perjuangan Senen ("Senen Monument of Struggle") is a monument located within the complex of Gelanggang Remaja Senen (Senen Youth Center). The monument was officially inaugurated by the mayor of Central Jakarta A. Munir on 2 May 1982. It was erected to commemorate the revolutionary struggle in maintaining the self-proclaimed independence of Indonesia from the Allied occupation, specifically the arrival of the war ship of the Allied in Jakarta Bay on 29 September 1945.

The monument was designed by native sculptor Sadiman, Suhartono and Haryang Iskandar, and painter Suyono Palal. It is made with cement concrete cast from Sleman Regency, Central Java.

Future development
Senen railway station will be developed in the future as an integrated transit-oriented planning.

See also

List of colonial buildings and structures in Jakarta

References

Cited works

 

Districts of Jakarta
Shopping districts and streets in Indonesia
Central Jakarta